Chocolate cake is a dessert cake made using chocolate.

Chocolate cake may also refer to:

 a chocolate bar
 Chocolate Cake (cocktail) an alcoholic drink
 Chocolate Cake (song) a song by Crowded House
 My Friend The Chocolate Cake a musical group